The Nikon FE2 is a 35 mm single lens reflex (SLR) camera manufactured by Nippon Kogaku K. K. (Nikon Corporation since 1988) in Japan from 1983 to 1987. The FE2 used a Nikon-designed vertical-travel focal-plane shutter with a speed range of 8 to 1/4000th second, plus Bulb and flash X-sync of 1/250th second. It has dimensions of  height,  width,  depth and  weight, and was available in two colors: black with chrome trim and all black. The introductory US list price for the chrome body only (no lens) was $446.  Note that SLRs usually sold for 30 to 40 percent below list price.

The FE2 is a member of the classic Nikon compact F-series 35 mm SLRs and was built upon a compact but rugged copper-aluminum alloy chassis similar (but not identical) to the ones used by the earlier Nikon FM (introduced in 1977), FE (1978), and FM2 (1982) cameras.  The FM2/FE2 twins were improved successors to the successful Nikon FM/FE cameras with enhanced features, but minor external controls and cosmetic differences.  The Nikon FA of 1983 also used this basic body design and the limited-production Nikon FM3A of 2001 continued to use it until 2006.

Features 
The FE2 accepts all lenses with the Nikon F bayonet mount (introduced in 1959) supporting the Automatic Indexing (AI) feature (introduced in 1977).The contemporary Nikon made AI lenses were the Nikkor AI-S, Nikkor AI and Nikon Series E types. During the early 1980s, Nippon Kogaku manufactured approximately 70 Nikkor AI-S and Nikon Series E branded lenses.They ranged from a Fisheye-Nikkor 6 mm f/2.8 220˚ circular fisheye to a Reflex-Nikkor 2000 mm f/11 super telephoto.
The AF-S Nikkor, AF-I Nikkor, AF Nikkor D and AF Nikkor auto-focus lenses are also AI types.

Nikon's most recent 35 mm film SLR lenses, the AF Nikkor G type (introduced in 2000) lacking an aperture control ring; and the AF Nikkor DX type (2003) with image circles sized for Nikon's digital SLRs will mount, but will not function properly.IX Nikkor lenses (1996), for Nikon's Advanced Photo System (APS) film SLRs, must not be mounted, as their rear elements will intrude far enough into the mirror box to cause damage.

Accessories for the FE2 included the Nikon MD-12 motor drive (automatic film advance up to 3.2 frames per second), the Nikon MF-16 databack (sequential numbering, time or date stamping on the film), and the Nikon SB-15 (guide number 82/25 (feet/meters) at ASA/ISO 100) and Nikon SB-16B (guide number 105/32 (feet/meters) at ASA/ISO 100) electronic flashes.

The FE2 is a battery-powered (two S76 or A76, or one 1/3N) electro-mechanically controlled manual-focus SLR with manual exposure control or aperture-priority auto-exposure.It has a match-needle exposure control system using two needles pointing along a vertical shutter speed scale on the left side of the viewfinder to indicate the readings of the built-in 60/40 percent center-weighted light meter versus the actual camera settings.This system can be traced back to the Nikkormat EL (in the USA/Canada; Nikomat EL, rest of the world) of 1972 and continued until 2006 with the Nikon FM3A.The viewfinder also has an interchangeable Type K2 focusing screen with Nikon's standard 3 mm split image rangefinder and 1 mm micro-prism collar focusing aids plus 12 mm etched circle indicating the area of the meter center-weighting.

The major improvements in the FE2 compared to the FE are a brighter viewing screen, provision for through-the-lens (TTL) off-the-film (OTF) electronic flash automation (essentially identical to the system introduced in the Nikon FG in 1982) and a quartz oscillator timed, bearing-mounted, titanium-bladed shutter reaching an ultra-fast top speed of 1/4000th second (plus world's fastest X-sync to 1/250th second).
This design is an improved electronically controlled version of the mechanical shutter introduced in the Nikon FM2, with eight honeycomb-patterned blades instead of nine and shutter curtain travel time further reduced to 3.3 milliseconds from 3.6 milliseconds.The FE2 also introduced a unique rotating flywheel plus inertial mass damping system to minimize mirror shock vibration effects and render a mirror lock-up feature unnecessary.

Design history 
The 1970s and 1980s were an era of intense competition between the major SLR brands: Nikon, Canon, Minolta, Pentax and Olympus.  Between circa 1975 to 1985, there was a dramatic shift away from heavy all-metal manual mechanical camera bodies to much more compact bodies with integrated circuit (IC) electronic automation.  In addition, because of rapid advances in electronics, the brands continually leap frogged each other with models having new or more automatic features.  The industry was trying to expand out from the saturated high-end professional market and appeal to the large mass of low-end amateur photographers itching to move up from compact automatic leaf-shutter rangefinder (RF) cameras to the more versatile SLR but were intimidated by the need to learn all details of its operation.

The FE2 was intended by Nikon as a quality alternative to the more cheaply built 35 mm amateur SLRs by other manufacturers of the day. It can be described as Nippon Kogaku's Nikon FM2 mechanical (springs, gears, levers) camera with precision electronic controls grafted on. Its unusual roots were most obvious in its backup ability to operate without batteries – albeit in a limited fashion: completely manual mechanical control with limited shutter speeds (1/250th second, marked M250, or Bulb) and without the light meter. The FE2 shared the luxurious bearing-mounted film advance and transport mechanism of its other high-level cameras, and many were used by professional photographers. The FE2's deliberately conservative external features (no program modes or matrix metering) were not intended to appeal to beginners, but rather to experienced photographers who required a reliable camera capable of withstanding extremes of climate, impacts, and extended use. Nikon believed that advanced amateur photographers were not interested in every possible automated bell and whistle, but rather the highest possible quality and precision.

The Nikon FE2 was a 35mm single-lens reflex (SLR) camera produced during the era of intense competition between the major camera brands such as Nikon, Canon, Minolta, Pentax, and Olympus. This era saw a shift from heavy, all-metal manual mechanical camera bodies to more compact bodies with integrated circuit (IC) electronic automation.

The FE2 was intended by Nikon to be a high-quality alternative to the cheaper 35mm amateur SLRs produced by other manufacturers at the time. The camera blended the luxurious bearing-mounted film advance and transport mechanism of the Nikon FM2 with precision electronic controls. As a result, the FE2 had the ability to operate without batteries, although in a limited fashion, with manual mechanical control and limited shutter speeds (1/250th second, marked M250, or Bulb) and without a light meter.

The FE2 was designed for experienced photographers who required a reliable and durable camera that could withstand extreme conditions and prolonged use. Unlike other SLRs of the time, the FE2 did not have program modes or matrix metering, as Nikon believed that advanced amateur photographers were more interested in quality and precision over a plethora of automated features.

Despite not being as popular as other contemporary SLRs with more advanced features but lower construction quality, the Nikon FE2 has stood the test of time and is now considered one of the finest SLRs of its generation. It is highly sought after by collectors and commands prices close to its original retail price in mint condition.

Although the FE2 sold well, it was not as popular as less expensive competing contemporary SLRs with a fancier feature set but vastly inferior internal design and construction quality  – for example, the Canon A-1 (1978) or the Minolta X-700 (1982). Time has proven Nikon's philosophy to be the right one – it is very tough and reliable and it is now regarded as one of the finest SLRs of its generation. It is very popular on the user-collectible market and commands prices (in mint condition) close to when it was new.

In conclusion, the Nikon FE2 was a unique and well-designed camera that blended mechanical and electronic components to create a high-quality and reliable SLR. Despite not being as popular as other contemporary SLRs, the FE2 has proven to be one of the finest SLRs of its generation and continues to be highly valued by collectors.

References 

 "Nikon MF/AF Bodies – Lens Compatibility" http://www.nikonlinks.com/unklbil/bodylens.htm  retrieved 3 January 2006
 Anonymous.  "Modern Tests: Nikon FE2 Adds Superfast Shutter And Much More" pp. 86–92.  Modern Photography, Volume 47, Number 10; October 1983.
 Anonymous.  "Modern Photography's Annual Guide '84: 48 Top Cameras: Nikon FE2" p. 83.  Modern Photography, Volume 47, Number 12; December 1983.
 Anonymous.  Nikon FE2 Advertisement.  "Instead of owning a camera designed for millions maybe you need a camera engineered for a few."  pp. 20–21.  Modern Photography, Volume 47, Number 7; July 1983.  pp. 30–31. Modern Photography, Volume 48, Number 2; February 1984.
 Anonymous.  Nikon FE2 Advertisement. "The Nikon FE2. Because not every artist uses a brush and palette." pp. 66–67. Modern Photography, Volume 48, Number 11; November 1984.
 Anonymous. KEH Camera Brokers catalogue, Sept 1996. Atlanta, GA: KEH Camera Brokers, 1996.
 Comen, Paul.  Magic Lantern Guides: Nikon Classic Cameras; F, FE, FE2, FA and Nikkormat F series.  First Edition.  Magic Lantern Guides. Rochester, NY: Silver Pixel Press, 1996.  
 Keppler, Herbert.  "Keppler's SLR Notebook: Vibration: How Big An SLR Bogeyman???"  pp. 38–39, 134, 136.  Modern Photography, Volume 48, Number 12; December 1984.
 Peterson, B. Moose.  Magic Lantern Guides: Nikon Classic Cameras, Volume II; F2, FM, EM, FG, N2000 (F-301), N2020 (F-501), EL series.  First Edition.  Magic Lantern Guides. Rochester, NY: Silver Pixel Press, 1996.  
 Stafford, Simon and Rudi Hillebrand & Hans-Joachim Hauschild.  The New Nikon Compendium: Cameras, Lenses & Accessories since 1917.  2004 Updated North American Edition. Asheville, NC: Lark Books, 2003.

External links

 Nikon FE2 photo from Nikon Corp (Japan) online archives
 Nikon FE2
 Nikon FE2 information page from Nikon Corp online archives
 Nikon FE2 articles from www.mir.com.my Photography in Malaysia

FE2
FE2
135 film cameras